The Campaign for an Independent Britain (CIBUK) is a cross-party UK Eurosceptic campaign group and think tank, founded in 1969.

Since the EU Referendum in 2016 the organisation has continued to campaign for the full withdrawal from the remaining obligations which subject the United Kingdom to the direct effect of European Union law.

Origins & History 
The Campaign for an Independent Britain (CIBUK) was formed in 1976, and originally known as the Safeguard Britain Campaign. It was formed with the objective of repealing the European Communities Act 1972.

Founding organisations included the Labour Euro Safeguards Campaign and Get Britain Out.

It was also instrumental in setting up TEAM (The Alliance of Euro-critical Movements) which is the body to which many Eurosceptic groups across the European continent belong.

CIBUK campaigned against the UK’s accession to the European Community in 1973 and again in the 1975 referendum which sought to ratify the changes to the terms of UK membership negotiated by Harold Wilson.

The Conservative Party promised a referendum on EU membership as part of its election manifesto in 2015 and following the General Election, CIBUK began to step up its activities ahead of the referendum in 2016.

Even though the United Kingdom officially left the European Union on 31st January 2020, CIBUK continues to campaign while outstanding issues between the UK and the EU remain.

Structure 
CIBUK is an unincorporated association supported by public donations with an elected executive of up to 17 members and a board of patrons.

Aims & Objectives 
CIBUK is non-partisan group. Its constitutional objective is stated as follows:

 “to campaign for the restoration of full national sovereignty to the UK by its withdrawal from the obligations of the Treaties of European Union and the repeal of the European Communities Act 1972 as amended so that Parliament may legislate freely and the UK may co-operate with other nations as it thinks fit;”
 “to oppose any cession of sovereignty from the United Kingdom or any of its constituent parts to the European Union or to other supranational bodies without the direct consent of its people by way of referendum and to expose the operations and activities of those bodies that run contrary to the interests of the United Kingdom and its people;
 “to campaign for the preservation of British values of respect, tolerance and individual liberty; encouraging the drive to take full advantage of the opportunities that are available to our country; and promoting the United Kingdom as a shining beacon of independence, freedom, democracy, and enterprise in an ever-changing world.”

CIBUK also seeks to rebut the claims of those who wish to re-join the European Union by publishing daily reports based on verifiable data from independent, respected sources or by promoting the work of its affiliates.

Current activities 
CIBUK sends out regular press releases and bulletins and publishes interviews with key international figures via its You Tube channel.

People
CIBUK’s Chairman is Leigh Evans who replaced long serving Chairman, Edward Spalton in January 2022. He is also Chairman and Founder of Brexit Facts4EU, Chairman of the China Analysis Group Ltd and Vice-Chairman of the City United Project.

CIBUK’s Deputy Chairman and Honorary Treasurer is Professor Daniel Hodson. Professor Hodson is a former CEO and Regulatory Responsible Officer of LIFFE (now ICE), and Gresham Professor of Commerce, having been involved in Brexit for over a decade as former Chairman of the OpCo of The People’s Pledge, Treasurer of Business for Britain, Director of Vote Leave and Chairman of The City for Britain.

CIBUK’s Communications Director and  Honorary Secretary is Ben Philips. Ben is the founder-owner of a family-owned business with a background in investment banking operations at Deutsche Bank, Credit Suisse and UBS.

Patrons

CIBUK’s Patrons include the Hon Mrs Buchan of Auchmacoy, Lord Clifford of Chudleigh, Lord Willoughby de Broke, Lord Grantley, Baroness the Rt Hon Kate Hoey, Lord Kalms, Lord Lamont, Lord Stevens of Ludgate, Baroness Catherine Meyer, Lord Walsingham, Earl of Wemyss and March, Sir Richard Storey Bt, Philip Davies MP, Philip Hollobone MP, The Rt Hon David Jones MP, Andrew Rosindell MP, Graham Stringer MP, Sammy Wilson MP, Christopher Gill, Rev'd Dr Peter Mullen, and Douglas Carswell.

See also
 Business for Britain
 Conservatives for Britain
 Democracy Movement
 Grassroots Out (GO)
 Labour Leave
 Leave Means Leave
 Leave.EU
 Vote Leave

References

External links
 Campaign for an Independent Britain website
 Campaign Against Euro-federalism
 Labour Euro-Safeguards Campaign
 Catalogue of the papers of the Campaign for an Independent Britain held at LSE Archives

Brexit–related advocacy groups in the United Kingdom
Cross-party campaigns
Euroscepticism in the United Kingdom
Organisations based in Nottinghamshire
1969 establishments in the United Kingdom
Worksop